The National Beer Wholesalers Association (NBWA) is a trade association that represents the interests of more than 2,850 beer distributors throughout the United States before government and the public. In 2020, their political action committee was the second largest, ranked by total amount raised.

About
Founded in 1938 in the aftermath of Prohibition, NBWA represents nearly 3,000 licensed, independent beer distributors - and their approximately 130,000 employees - who have operations in every state and congressional district across the United States. The organization works to strengthen and maintain the state-based system of alcohol regulation.

According to the association's web site, NBWA works to strengthen the state-based system of alcohol regulation that facilitates an orderly marketplace; creates a transparent and accountable system of alcohol distribution that protects American consumers; and promotes responsibility in the manufacture, distribution, sale and consumption of alcohol.

The association is led by Craig A. Purser, who became president and CEO in 2005. In 2007, NBWA was named among Washingtonian Magazine's list of "Great Places to Work."

NBWA's primary mission is to advocate for state-based alcohol regulation while providing leadership and guidance to America's beer distributors.

Political action committee
The National Beer Wholesalers Association Political Action Committee (NBWA PAC) is the largest political action committee (PAC) in the licensed beverage industry. According to OpenSecrets, the NBWA's PAC was the second-largest federal PAC during the 2020 election cycle, raising $4.1 million and distributing $3.1 million, behind only the National Association of Realtors. Over the last seven elections, their donations have been bipartisan, never surpassing 60% to a single party.

References

External links
 NBWA.org
 BeerServesAmerica.org

United States political action committees
Trade associations based in the United States
Alcohol industry trade associations